WKEG (1030 AM) is a non-commercial Catholic radio station in Sterling Heights, Michigan. The station broadcasts with 5,000 watts, daytime only, with coverage of the Detroit, Michigan metropolitan area. WKEG is a Class D station operating on the clear-channel frequency of 1030 AM; WBZ in Boston, Massachusetts is the dominant Class A station on this frequency.

The station was purchased and began broadcasting on October 26, 1988 as the seventh station owned and operated by Family Life Communications (commonly referred to as FLR or Family Life Radio), with the call sign WUFL.

In November 2022, it was announced Family Life Radio would sell WUFL and its four translators to Relevant Radio, which is a Catholic broadcaster. The deal included the land that houses WUFL's transmitter but not the call sign, which will be transferred to another Family Life Radio property. 

The sale to Relevant Radio was consummated on February 28, 2023, at a price of $3.1 million. On March 2, 2023, the station changed its call sign to WKEG.

References

External links

KEG
Relevant Radio stations
Sterling Heights, Michigan
Radio stations established in 1989
1989 establishments in Michigan
KEG
KEG